Sheryl Lyna Stamps Leach (born December 31, 1952) is an American author and creator of the children's show Barney & Friends, along with Kathy Parker and Dennis DeShazer.

Education
Leach holds a bachelor's degree in elementary education from Southern Methodist University (SMU) and a master's degree in bilingual education from Texas A&M University.

Career
Leach created Barney the Dinosaur in 1988. Together with co-creators Kathy Parker and Dennis DeShazer, she developed and launched the Barney property worldwide. Barney became one of the highest-rated children's television series and a best-selling children's brand globally.

Leach, a former teacher, worked with Parker and Deshazer on what would become the TV show in 1987. Originally, the star of the show was envisioned as a teddy bear, but since her toddler son sparked an interest in dinosaurs, the character was changed to a dinosaur. Leach and her team created a series of home videos called Barney and the Backyard Gang. The videos were sold directly to the public. In 1991, after Connecticut Public Television employee Larry Rifkin rented a Barney video for his daughter, he spoke with the creators about putting Barney on television. In October of that year, production began on the new TV show, titled Barney & Friends, and in April 1992, it premiered on PBS. Barney went onto receive a number of awards and honors.

Awards
Among other awards, Leach was nominated for the 20th and 23rd Annual Daytime Emmy Awards. She holds an honorary doctorate from Texas A&M University–Commerce.

Philanthropy
Leach and her life partner Howard Rosenfeld have sponsored projects through their philanthropy organization the Shei'rah Foundation, including a number of documentaries. The Foundation also supported several youth-based media projects.

In 2007, Leach and Rosenfeld designed and built The Smithy, a specialty retail outlet in the village of New Preston in Litchfield County Connecticut, that sells local artisan foods and handicrafts and supports local farmers and producers.

Leach and Rosenfeld are also involved with community development and land conservation projects in Litchfield County. They own and support two organic farms and were credited by Litchfield Magazine as one of the initiators of the "farm to table" movement in the area.

Leach supports several farming causes and organizations, including Partners for Sustainable Healthy Communities in Litchfield County. The mission of the organization is to "cultivate better communities by nurturing and supporting programs that connect and support sustainable agriculture, local food and active, healthy lifestyles." One of their programs is the Farmer's Table Dinner program co-founded by Leach and Rosenfeld in 2011, along with friends and neighbors. Over the past eleven years, the Farmer's Table program—that began as an annual dinner—has expanded to support the growth of farming in the community through a variety of events and programs.

References

External links

Startup Nation - Thinking Big, Really Big: Sheryl Leach

1952 births
Living people
Barney & Friends
People from Dallas
Television producers from Texas
American women television producers
American television writers
American women television writers
Screenwriters from Texas